Guy Tilden (May 11, 1858 – August, 6, 1929) was a Canton, Ohio, United States Architect during the late 19th and early 20th century. Several of his structures are listed on the National Register of Historic Places.

Guy Tilden was born in Youngstown, Ohio on May 11, 1858. He married Belle La Grande Sanford on November 21, 1880 and moved to Alliance, and then to Canton in 1883. He and his wife had four children. Over the next decades, until the mid-1920s, he was Canton's premier architect. In 1889 he was named a Fellow of the American Institute of Architects. Guy Tilden died August, 1929. He was buried at West Lawn Cemetery A listing of some of the structures he designed follows

Structures

National Register of Historic Places
Tilden designed numerous structures in Canton, Ohio, which were reviewed in a study that nominated many of them for nomination to the National Register of Historic Places.

All located in Canton
 Bender's Restaurant-Belmont Buffet
 Canton Public Library
 Case Mansion
 Harry E. Fife House
 Harvard Company-Weber Dental Manufacturing Company
 Hotel Courtland
 Brooke and Anna E. Martin House
 Trinity Lutheran Church

Others

 Congress Lake Clubhouse - Lake Township
 Lions Lincoln Theater - Massillon
 Seventh Street Bridge (since replaced) - Canton
 Dueber-Hampden Watch Factory - Canton
 Seneca Street School - Alliance
 Hotel McKinley - Canton
 Dime Savings Bank - Canton
 F.E. Case Building - Canton
 William E. Sherlock Residence - Canton
 A.M. Dueber Residence - Canton
 Harry Harper Ink Residence - Canton
 Northeast and Southwest YMCA - Canton

Notes

References

 

People from Canton, Ohio
Architects from Ohio
1858 births
1929 deaths
Fellows of the American Institute of Architects
Burials at West Lawn Cemetery